Nadalj is a village located in the Srbobran municipality, in the South Bačka District of Serbia. It is situated in the Autonomous Province of Vojvodina. The village has a Serb ethnic majority and its population numbering 2,202 people (2002 census).

Historical population

1961: 2,441
1971: 2,163
1981: 2,042
1991: 1,952

Notable people
 Momčilo Tapavica, tennis player, weightlifter, wrestler and architect.

See also
List of places in Serbia
List of cities, towns and villages in Vojvodina

References
Slobodan Ćurčić, Broj stanovnika Vojvodine, Novi Sad, 1996.

External links

Nadalj

Places in Bačka
South Bačka District
Srbobran